The Progressive Building Society was founded in 1914 in Belfast, and operates 12 branches across Northern Ireland. It is a member of the Building Societies Association. In July 2014, it merged with the City of Derry Building Society.

References

External links
Building Societies Association
KPMG Building Societies Database 2008

1914 establishments in Ireland
Building societies of the United Kingdom
Banks established in 1914
Financial services companies of Northern Ireland
Organizations established in 1914